Utpala in Sanskrit is a neuter noun with two meanings, both given by  (a lexicon of circa. 400 AD). The first meaning is Nymphaea caerulea, the "blue lotus", also known as kuvalaya in Sanskrit.

In Buddhist art the utpala flower is an attribute of the goddess Tara, who very often holds one in her hand, as other Buddhist and Hindu figures may also do.  Later, the utpala becomes specific to the Green Tara form, while the White Tara holds a white lotus flower (probably Nymphaea lotus).   In Tibet, where none of the tender aquatic plants that may be known as lotus can grow, utpala became a general term for all of them.

Monier-Williams gives the following meanings of utpala: (1) the blossom of the blue lotus Nymphaea caerulea (-Mahābhārata, Rāmāyana, Suśruta, Raghuvamsa, Meghdoota, etc.),(2) a seed of  Nymphaea caerulea (-Suśruta), (3) the plant Costus speciosus (-Bhagavata Purāna), (4) any water-lily, any flower, (-lexicons) (5) a particular hell (-Buddhist literature), (6) name of a Nāga, (7) names of several persons, including an astronomer, (8) its feminine form utpalā meant a river (-Harivamśa), (9) its feminine form utpalā also meant a kind of cake made of unwinnowed corn (-lexicons);

An unrelated homonym, compounded from ud "apart" + pala "flesh" means 'fleshless, emaciated' (-lexicons) and is the name of a particular hell (-lexicons).

Notes

References
.

Buddhist iconography
Flowers in religion